The 2022 Liberal Party of Australia (South Australian Division) leadership election or 2022 South Australian Liberal Party leadership election, was the leadership contest for the vacancy of leader of the Liberal Party of South Australia and the Leader of the Opposition, following the previous months' state election loss, and resignation of then-leader Steven Marshall. The leadership contest was between three candidates: David Speirs, Josh Teague and Nick McBride. Speirs won the ballot contest by an overwhelming majority, succeeding Steven Marshall as leader and becoming the Leader of the Opposition.

Quitting Leader and Premier, Steven Marshall, had held the position of leader from 2013, coming to the position following competitive, indecisive leadership contests. He was subsequently one of the longest-serving leaders of the party. Upon his party's loss, he stated: “I thank all my past and current colleagues for their support over the past nine years and will do all that I can to assist the new Liberal leader to succeed.” Adding: “I also look forward to continuing to serve the people of Dunstan.”

Deputy Leader Dan van Holst Pellekaan also stood down, being succeeded by John Gardner who beat Tim Whetstone and Vincent Tarzia in another three-way contest.

Contest
With the new composition of the State Parliament, the total number of MPs (parliamentary caucus) eligible to vote were twenty-four. These were sixteen Assembly members and eight Council members. 

With the leadership election not concluding until a month after the election, speculation began as to who would announce their candidacy to succeed Steven Marshall. Several names were put out such as Nick McBride, moderate-aligned Morialta MP John Gardner and expected front-runner David Speirs. 

The first announced candidate for the leadership ballot was MacKillop MP Nick McBride on 21 March, two days after the election. Having almost quit the party a year prior, and only being in Parliament since 2018, the backbencher was considered the weakest candidate. The next announced candidate was former House of Assembly Speaker and former Minister for Planning and Local Government, Josh Teague (Heysen). Just days later the expected front-runner, former Environment Minister and eight-year MP David Speirs, who had unsuccessfully run for Deputy Leader in 2021, announced his candidacy. He was the longest-serving MP of the announced candidates, and the youngest (36–38).

See also
  
2022 South Australian state election
2022 Australian federal election

Notes

References

2022 elections in Australia
Liberal Party of Australia leadership spills
Liberal Party of Australia (South Australian Division) leadership election